The Yamaha GTS1000 is a sport-touring motorcycle introduced by Yamaha in 1993, sold until 1994 in the United States, and sold elsewhere until 1999. It is notable for its forkless front suspension, specifically a RADD, Inc., front suspension designed by James Parker.  This suspension provided improved stability under braking, but the improvement did not justify the additional cost for the consumer, and the bike was not commercially successful.

The GTS1000 also had advanced technologies not normally found on motorcycles at the time, such as OCC (Omega Chassis concept),  single sided front swingarm, electronic fuel injection, ABS brakes, catalytic converter and six-piston front-brake caliper. 

In 2006, Bike declared the 1994 Yamaha GTS1000 the coolest of rare motorcycles. "Scarce, stylish, yet capable and completely usable: that's cool in our book."

References

GTS1000
Touring motorcycles